Cauê Cecilio da Silva (born 24 May 1989), commonly known as Cauê, is a Brazilian footballer who last played for Japanese club Avispa Fukuoka, as a central midfielder.

Career
In June 2014, Cauê signed a two-year contract with Azerbaijan Premier League team Neftchi Baku.

In January 2017, Cauê scored in the 'Taça da Liga' final helping Moreirense achieve their first ever major Portuguese honour.

From 2017, Cauê played for the Japanese team Omiya Ardija in which he signed a contract for two seasons.

On 15 February 2021, he returned to Japan and signed with Avispa Fukuoka.

Career statistics

Club

Honours
Moreirense
Taça da Liga: 2016–17

References

External links
 
 
 

1989 births
Living people
Brazilian footballers
Footballers from São Paulo
Association football midfielders
Olaria Atlético Clube players
Leixões S.C. players
S.C. Olhanense players
FC Vaslui players
Neftçi PFK players
Hapoel Tel Aviv F.C. players
Moreirense F.C. players
Omiya Ardija players
Albirex Niigata players
Belenenses SAD players
Avispa Fukuoka players
Primeira Liga players
Liga I players
Azerbaijan Premier League players
Israeli Premier League players
J1 League players
Brazilian expatriate footballers
Expatriate footballers in Portugal
Expatriate footballers in Romania
Expatriate footballers in Azerbaijan
Expatriate footballers in Israel
Expatriate footballers in Japan
Brazilian expatriate sportspeople in Portugal
Brazilian expatriate sportspeople in Romania
Brazilian expatriate sportspeople in Azerbaijan
Brazilian expatriate sportspeople in Israel
Brazilian expatriate sportspeople in Japan